Czyżówka  is a village in the administrative district of Gmina Trzebinia, within Chrzanów County, Lesser Poland Voivodeship, in southern Poland. The village is located in the historical region, Galicia.

The village has a population of 702.

References

Villages in Chrzanów County